Don't Hesitate is a South Korean television series starring Lee Tae-im, Lee Sang-woo, Kim Young-jae, and Bae Min-hee. The morning soap opera aired on SBS on Mondays to Fridays at 8:40 a.m. from October 5, 2009 to February 26, 2010 for 98 episodes.

Plot
Jang Soo-hyun was a woman who'd previously devoted her life to love, even donating her liver to save her first love, but was rewarded by betrayal. Since then, she has become jaded and resolved to distance herself from relationships. Until she meets Han Tae-woo, a man who has never known or believed in love. Tae-woo had built a wall around his heart in fear of being hurt again, but Soo-hyun becomes someone whom he learns to sacrifice everything for.

Cast
Jang family
Lee Tae-im as Jang Soo-hyun
Kim Hye-ok as Cha Young-ran
Kim Hee-joon as Jang Soo-ho
Kim Hyung-bum as Cha Dal-soo

Han family
Lee Sang-woo as Han Tae-woo
Kang Soo-han as young Tae-woo 
Park Young-ji as Han Jin-kyu
Choi Ran as Uhm Mi-soon

Choi family
Kim Young-jae as Choi Min-young
Bae Min-hee as Oh Sun-ah
Lee Hye-sook as Lee Jung-soo
Yoon Yi-na as Choi Min-ae

Extended cast
Lee Jung-gil as President Song Choong-hee
Won Sook-hee as Baek Sung-mi
Lee Seung-hyung as Choi Man-soo
Moon Ji-in as Kim Ga-roo
Hong Yeo-jin as Hong Na-ryung (Sun-ah's mother)
Baek Seung-hyeon as Kim Byung-soo
Jang Joon-ho as PD Han
Jo Hee as blind date man
Seo Ji-yeon as Secretary Kim
Park Ha-young
Kim Gyu-jin
Eun Joo-hee

Awards and nominations

References

External links
Don't Hesitate official SBS website 

Seoul Broadcasting System television dramas
Korean-language television shows
2009 South Korean television series debuts
2010 South Korean television series endings
South Korean romance television series